Trois 2: Pandora's Box (also known as Pandora's Box) is a 2002 erotic thriller written and directed by Rob Hardy and starring Monica Calhoun, Michael Jai White, and Kristoff St. John.

When first released, the film was known as Pandora's Box. The studio believed that it was similar in some ways to director Rob Hardy's film Trois and branded it as a franchise. Chrystale Wilson reprises her role as Tammy from Trois.

Plot
A woman's infidelity leads her into a web of larceny and danger in this noir-flavored independent thriller. Mia DuBois (Monica Calhoun) is a behavioral psychologist who until recently worked with the police department, counseling the surviving victims of violent crime. While Mia has entered into a successful private practice, she's persuaded by her former colleagues to take on new client, Tammy (Chrystale Wilson), who is still dealing with the recent murder of her husband. As Mia helps Tammy with her problems, Mia finds herself thinking about her own marriage to Victor (Kristoff St. John), which has hardly been happy lately. As Mia begins wondering if she has other options, she visits a mysterious nightclub, Pandora's Box, where she meets the sexy and mysterious Hampton Hines (Michael Jai White). Mia soon begins having an affair with Hampton, unaware that Hampton is actually working with Victor and Tammy; Mia is soon to inherit $20 million, and Victor is determined to get his hands on the money. Hampton soon shifts his alliances to stay with Mia, but Victor and Tammy are not giving up their shares of the fortune quite so easily.

Cast
Monica Calhoun as Mia DuBois
Michael Jai White as Hampton Hines
Kristoff St. John as Victor DuBois
Joey Lawrence as Detective Anderson
Chrystale Wilson as Tammy Racine
Tyson Beckford as Lance Racine

Reception
The film debuted in theaters on August 9, 2002. Bringing in $85,710 from 14 cites, it opened in 38th place on the box office charts with an average gross of $6,122 per theater. Although Pandora's Box received poor reviews from critics, it was enjoyed by fans of the Trois series. The film was nominated for the Blockbuster Award for Best Feature Film and Monica Calhoun received the Best Performance by an Actress award at the 2002 American Black Film Festival. Calhoun was also nominated for Best Independent Film Actress at the 2003 Black Reel Awards.

Sequel
On December 28, 2004, Columbia TriStar Home Video released Trois: The Escort, the third film in the series, direct-to-video.

References

External links
 
 
 

2002 films
African-American films
2000s erotic thriller films
Films produced by Will Packer
Rainforest Films films
American erotic thriller films
American sequel films
Films shot in Atlanta
2000s English-language films
2000s American films